Ludwig Gehre (5 October 1895 – 9 April 1945) was an officer and resistance fighter involved in the preparation of an assassination attempt against Adolf Hitler.

Life
Gehre was born in Düsseldorf, Germany. Little detail is known of his early years in the parental home, or the education he received. The first reference to Gehre appears when he was a managing director of a building contractor. In 1928, he published a study on Clausewitz; by that time he is supposed to have begun his career as an officer in the Reichswehr.

Contact man with the conspirators
At the beginning of the Second World War, Gehre was active as a captain in the Abwehr that had formed to remove the Nazi regime and end the war. This circle included Canaris, General Ludwig Beck, Hans von Dohnanyi, Hans Oster and Dietrich Bonhoeffer, as well as Gehre.

By March 1943, Gehre was privy to the preparations under Henning von Tresckow to assassinate Hitler. In January 1944, Helmuth James Graf von Moltke was arrested, and in March 1944 Gehre was also taken by the Gestapo. Gehre, however, was soon able to flee and disappeared.

After the failed 20 July 1944 assassination attempt to kill Hitler, the search for Gehre intensified. Gehre, together with his wife, kept himself hidden for several more weeks. Further shelter was procured by the brothers Hans and Otto John. When Gehre realised that he was about to be discovered by the Gestapo on 2 November, he shot his wife and then directed the gun toward himself. Although he was badly hurt, he survived.

On 3 February 1945, the building of the Central Reich Security Office on Prinz-Albrecht-Straße, Berlin was destroyed. Gehre, along with Bonhoeffer, was sent to the Buchenwald concentration camp. From there, he was put onto a transport of SS special detainees and on 5 April incarcerated in the Flossenbürg concentration camp. On 9 April 1945, after an SS flying court-martial, Gehre and Bonhoeffer along with Admiral Wilhelm Canaris, General Hans Oster, General Karl Sack and Captain Theodor Strünck were executed at Flossenbürg by hanging.

In 1946, the individuals who had participated in the flying court-martial were brought to justice for murder. However Otto Thorbeck, the presiding officer, was exonerated after appeal. The decision was rescinded by the Berlin State Court in 1996.

References

Bibliography
  Encyclopedia of the resistance 1933-1945 , hrsg. by Peter Steinbach/Johannes Tuchel, Munich 1994, 
 Winfried Heinemann:  The military resistance and the war.  In: The German Reich and the war. Given change of the military-historical office for research. Volume 9,1, Munich 2004, 
 Otto John:  Wrong and too late. 20 July 1944.  Munich and Berlin 1984,

External links
 GDW Ludwig Gehre
 negotiation against court martial/representation of the course of events
 memory place Bonhoeffer Rabenau Gehre
 Article in the German Wikipedia

1895 births
1945 deaths
Abwehr personnel of World War II
Military personnel from Düsseldorf
People who died in Flossenbürg concentration camp
Resistance members who died in Nazi concentration camps
Military personnel who died in Nazi concentration camps
People from North Rhine-Westphalia executed in Nazi concentration camps
Executed members of the 20 July plot
Executed people from North Rhine-Westphalia
People executed by Nazi Germany by hanging
People from the Rhine Province
People who were court-martialed
20th-century Freikorps personnel
Reichswehr personnel